Cryptic is the seventh full-length studio album by the Swedish death metal band Edge of Sanity, released on December 1, 1997 by Black Mark Production.

Cryptic is the only Edge of Sanity album to not feature any contributions from Dan Swanö. Guitarist Andreas Axelsson hired vocalist Robert Karlsson, who was previously the vocalist in Swanö's avant-garde death metal band Pan.Thy.Monium, in an attempt to keep the band together. Despite this, all members of this short-lived lineup of the band would depart following the album's release.

Track listing

Personnel
Edge of Sanity
 Robert Karlsson − lead vocals
 Andreas Axelsson − electric guitar
 Sami Nerberg − electric guitar
 Anders Lindberg − bass guitar
 Benny Larsson − drums, percussion

Production
 Martin Ahx - Artwork, Cover art
 Susan Nerberg - Artwork, Photography
 Anders Forsberg - Executive producer
 Alejandro Palavecino - Photography
 Peter in de Betou - Mastering
 Michael Semprevivo - Layout, Typography
 Ronny Lahti - Producer, Engineering, Mixing

References

1997 albums
Edge of Sanity albums